Sead Mašić (born 10 May 1959) is a Bosnian retired professional footballer.

Club career
Mašić was born in Bosanski Brod, Bosnia and Herzegovina. He played with FK Partizan between 1979 and 1985.  Playing as central defender, he played a total of 264 games and scored 14 goals with Partizan, 48 of which in the Yugoslav First League.  With Partizan Mašić won national Championship in 1983. In 1984, he moved to another top league club, NK Dinamo Vinkovci, and a year later he moved to FK Trepča and played two seasons in the Yugoslav Second League. In 1987, he moved abroad to France and played in the 3. Division with FC Canet 66, Le Puy Foot 43 and Angoulême.

He resides in Orange, France.

References

1959 births
Living people
People from Brod, Bosnia and Herzegovina
Association football defenders
Yugoslav footballers
FK Partizan players
HNK Cibalia players
FK Trepča players
Canet Roussillon FC players
Le Puy Foot 43 Auvergne players
Angoulême Charente FC players
Yugoslav First League players
Yugoslav Second League players
Championnat National players
Yugoslav expatriate footballers
Expatriate footballers in France
Yugoslav expatriate sportspeople in France